is a novel written by Japanese writer Haruki Murakami that has been announced to be released on April 13, 2023. The release date for an English translation has not been announced. The novel shares its title with Murakami's story of the same name, which was published in the September 1980 issue of Bungakukai. It is unknown if it is related to the story.

Plot 

Shinchosha Publishing has announced that the plot involves "a story that had long been sealed."

The publisher also shared a teaser that includes the text: "Must go to the city. No matter what happens. A locked up 'story' starts to move quietly as if 'old dreams' are woken up and unraveled in a secluded archive."

References

2023 Japanese novels
Novels by Haruki Murakami
Shinchosha books